Joseph Carlton Ferguson Jr. (born April 23, 1950) is a former American football quarterback who played in the National Football League (NFL) for 17 seasons, primarily with the Buffalo Bills. He played college football at Arkansas.

Early years

Ferguson played high school football in Shreveport, Louisiana for Woodlawn High School. He guided the Knights to the Louisiana High School Athletic Association Class AAA (the top classification at the time) state championship in 1968. Ferguson succeeded Terry Bradshaw as Woodlawn's starting quarterback.

Ferguson played college football at the University of Arkansas, where he held the school's single game record for most completions until broken in 2012 (31 against Texas A&M in 1971).

Professional career 
The Buffalo Bills selected Ferguson in the third round of the 1973 NFL Draft. Although he is most famous for playing with the Bills from 1973 to 1984, Ferguson also played three seasons for the Detroit Lions, two seasons for the Tampa Bay Buccaneers, and one final season with the Indianapolis Colts. Ferguson's number 12 with the Bills is now retired for his successor with the team, Hall of Famer Jim Kelly.

Ferguson placed in the top 10 in pass attempts five times, completions and passing yards four times, passing touchdowns six times, and yards per pass three times. At one time he shared, with Ron Jaworski, the NFL record for consecutive starts by a quarterback with 107, until he was replaced by Joe Dufek on September 30, 1984. He has a 1–3 record in the NFL postseason, winning against the New York Jets in 1981. His three losses came from the Cincinnati Bengals in those same 1981 playoffs, the San Diego Chargers the year before in 1980 (a game in which he played the entire contest with a sprained ankle), and in 1974 to the Pittsburgh Steelers. He retired after the 1990 season after playing only one game with the Colts.

In 1995, Ferguson briefly came out of retirement to serve as a backup quarterback for the San Antonio Texans of the Canadian Football League's South Division. Kay Stephenson, who had coached Ferguson in his last year in Buffalo, was coach of San Antonio at the time and needed an inexpensive backup who knew Stephenson's system after starter David Archer was injured midseason.

In 1975 Ferguson tied Fran Tarkenton for the NFL lead with 25 touchdown passes and compiled a passer rating of 81.3. Ferguson also surpassed 20 touchdown passes in three other seasons: 1980, 1981, 1983. He finished his career with 196 touchdowns thrown and 209 interceptions.

NFL career statistics

Regular season

Buffalo Bills franchise records 

 Highest touchdown percentage in a single season – 7.8 (1975)
 Lowest interception percentage in a single season – 0.7 (1976)
 Most sack yards lost in a single season – 387 (1979)
 Most interceptions thrown in a career – 190
 Most sack yards lost in a career – 2,529

Source:

Personal life
In May 2005, Ferguson was diagnosed with Burkitt's lymphoma cancer and underwent treatment at The University of Texas M. D. Anderson Cancer Center in Houston, Texas. In January 2008, Ferguson was diagnosed with acute myeloid leukemia. In February 2008, he was treated at M.D. Anderson in the intensive care unit for pneumonia. In July 2009, it was reported that Ferguson had recovered from his battles with cancer.

References

 

 

1950 births
Living people
American football quarterbacks
Arkansas Razorbacks football coaches
Arkansas Razorbacks football players
Buffalo Bills players
Detroit Lions players
Indianapolis Colts players
Louisiana Tech Bulldogs football coaches
People from Alvin, Texas
Players of American football from Buffalo, New York
Players of American football from Shreveport, Louisiana
Players of American football from Texas
San Antonio Texans players
Sportspeople from the Houston metropolitan area
Tampa Bay Buccaneers players